The 1948 Major League Baseball season was the Chicago White Sox' 48th season in the major leagues, and its 49th season overall. They finished eighth (last) in the American League with a 51–101 record, 44.5 games behind the first place Cleveland Indians. In 114 seasons, the White Sox have only once (in 1932) had a worse winning percentage. This was the first year of many for White Sox television broadcasts on WGN-TV channel 9.

Offseason 
 November 19, 1947: Pete Wojey was drafted from the White Sox by the Brooklyn Dodgers in the 1947 minor league draft.
 January 27, 1948: Thurman Tucker was traded by the White Sox to the Cleveland Indians for Ralph Weigel.
 February 24, 1948: Ed Lopat was traded by the White Sox to the New York Yankees for Bill Wight, Fred Bradley, and Aaron Robinson.
 Prior to 1948 season: Ed McGhee was signed as an amateur free agent by the White Sox.

Regular season 
Frank Lane was in his first season as White Sox general manager. Over the next seven years with the White Sox, Lane would make 241 trades. He would gain the nicknames "Trader" Lane and "Frantic Frank".

On July 18, Pat Seerey hit four home runs in an eleven inning game against the Philadelphia Athletics. The White Sox won, 12–11.

Season standings

Record vs. opponents

Opening Day lineup 
 Don Kolloway, 2B
 Luke Appling, 3B
 Tony Lupien, 1B
 Bob Kennedy, RF
 Taffy Wright, LF
 Jack Wallaesa, SS
 Dave Philley, CF
 Mike Tresh, C
 Joe Haynes, P

Roster

Player stats

Batting 
Note: G = Games played; AB = At bats; R = Runs scored; H = Hits; 2B = Doubles; 3B = Triples; HR = Home runs; RBI = Runs batted in; BB = Base on balls; SO = Strikeouts; AVG = Batting average; SB = Stolen bases

Pitching 
Note: W = Wins; L = Losses; ERA = Earned run average; G = Games pitched; GS = Games started; SV = Saves; IP = Innings pitched; H = Hits allowed; R = Runs allowed; ER = Earned runs allowed; HR = Home runs allowed; BB = Walks allowed; K = Strikeouts

Farm system 

LEAGUE CHAMPIONS: Hot Springs, Seminole

References

External links 
 1948 Chicago White Sox at Baseball Reference

Chicago White Sox seasons
Chicago White Sox season
Chicago White